Satpakhali is an ideal village in Kamrup rural district, situated in south bank of river Brahmaputra.
The village is adopted as a model village under the Sansad Adarsh Gram Yojana by Guwahati MP Bijoya Chakrabarty.

Transport
The village is accessible through National Highway 37 and connected to nearby towns and cities with regular buses and other modes of transportation.

See also
 Titkuri	
 Tukrapara

References

Villages in Kamrup district